David Zellner is an American film director, screenwriter and actor. He lives and works in Austin, Texas. Zellner is best known for directing the films Kid-Thing (2012) and Kumiko, the Treasure Hunter (2014).

Career 
David Zellner started his career by studying at the University of Texas film school and then staged exclusively Independent feature films and short films. He always works together with his younger brother Nathan Zellner under the name Zellner Bros.

For his feature film Kumiko, the Treasure Hunter (2014), starring Oscar-nominated actress Rinko Kikuchi, which he directed and acted in, and co-wrote with his brother Nathan Zellner, he won a Best Director Jury Prize award at the 2014 Fantasia Film Festival. The film also won an Audience Award for Best Film and Special Jury Award at the 2014 Las Palmas Film Festival. At the 2014 Little Rock Film Festival, the film won the Golden Rock Narrative Award for Best Feature Film, and at the 2014 Sundance Film Festival, the film won a U.S. Dramatic Special Jury Award for Musical Score (by The Octopus Project) and was also nominated for the U.S. Grand Jury Dramatic Prize. Furthermore, at the 2014 Nantucket Film Festival, David and his brother Nathan won the Showtime Tony Cox Award for Best Screenwriting in a Feature Film for their screenplay Kumiko. Kumiko also won a "Most Original Film" award at the Toronto After Dark Film Festival. David was nominated for a Best Director Independent Spirit Award in 2014 for directing the film, with lead actress Rinko Kikuchi who was nominated for a Best Female Lead Actress Independent Spirit Award. Additionally, for his producing work on Kumiko and several other films, Producer Chris Ohlson received the Independent Spirit Award's Piaget Producers Award.

For his feature film, Kid-Thing (2012), which he directed and wrote, David won a Best Film award from the 2012 Gen Art Film Festival. He also received 2nd place in a Village Voice Film Poll for "Best Undistributed Film."

David's short film Sasquatch Birth Journal 2 (2010), got into the Sundance Film Festival in 2011 and was nominated for the Sundance Short Filmmaking Award that year.

Filmography

Film

Web series

References

External links 
 
 Official Website of Zellner Bros.

Living people
Writers from Austin, Texas
American male screenwriters
People from Greeley, Colorado
Film directors from Texas
Sibling filmmakers
Year of birth missing (living people)
Film directors from Colorado
Screenwriters from Texas
Screenwriters from Colorado